Ask Tjærandsen-Skau (born 14 January 2001) is a Norwegian footballer who plays as a midfielder for Jerv, on loan Bodø/Glimt.

Club career
Tjærandsen-Skau was born in Bodø. He made his senior debut for Bodø/Glimt on 22 August 2020 against Start; Bodø/Glimt won 6–0.

In October 2020 Tjærandsen-Skau was loaned out to 1. divisjons club Stjørdals-Blink for the rest off the season. Before the 2021 season Tjærandsen-Skau was loaned out to Stjørdals-Blink for the rest off the season.

Career statistics

References

2001 births
Living people
Sportspeople from Bodø
Norwegian footballers
Eliteserien players
Association football midfielders
FK Bodø/Glimt players
IL Stjørdals-Blink players
IK Start players
Norway youth international footballers